The Principals Athletic Conference (PAC-7) is an Ohio High School Athletic Association (OHSAA) athletic league, formed in 1989, made up of seven schools from Stark, Summit, and Wayne counties with full membership, and one football-only member in Ashland County.

The PAC-7 is home to some of the biggest rivalries in Northeast Ohio high school sports: the Triway Titans vs. the Orrville Red Riders, the Fairless Falcons vs. Tuslaw Mustangs in "The Blue Cup", and the Manchester Panthers vs. the Northwest Indians.

Current members

Former members

Former affiliate member

Recent history
In January 2013, Northwest High School (Lawrence Township) and Orrville High School applied for membership in the PAC-8.  Both were turned down after a league discussion.
In February 2015, both Indian Valley and Tusky Valley announced that they would leave the PAC-8 in the 2016-17 school year to join the Inter-Valley Conference.
On February 25, 2015, the Canton City School District unanimously approved a proposal to consolidate their school district into one high school, which will effectively close Timken as a traditional high school.  Thus, Timken will drop out of the PAC. Timken will house Canton's freshmen, the Timken Early College High School, and several tech programs while sophomores, juniors, and seniors will attend Canton McKinley High School.
On February 18, 2015 four schools asked to join the PAC: Canton South, Northwest, Orrville, and Loudonville.
On March 4, 2015, two schools were invited to join the PAC: Orrville and Northwest.  They are expected to accept the invitation.  The league would like Orrville to join for 2016-17, bringing membership back up to eight after a year at seven, then would add Northwest for 2017-18 year when Indian Valley and Tusky Valley leave. On April 18, 2015, it was announced that the PAC accepted Loudonville's bid to join the league. Loudonville is expected to join the PAC as a football-only member for the 2017-2018 school year.
On July 1, 2020 the Canton Local School Board voted unanimously to join the Principals Athletic Conference. Canton South will officially leave the EBC and join the PAC-7 in August 2022. In 2022, Loudonville will step down as a football only member and join the Knox Morrow Athletic Conference.

See also
Ohio High School Athletic Conferences

References

Ohio high school sports conferences